This is a list of defunct airlines of Armenia.

See also

 List of airlines of Armenia
 List of airports in Armenia
 List of defunct airlines of Europe
 Transport in Armenia

References

Armenia
Airlines
Airlines, defunct